Psychometrika is the official journal of the Psychometric Society, a professional body devoted to psychometrics and quantitative psychology. The journal covers quantitative methods for measurement and evaluation of human behavior, including statistical methods and other mathematical techniques. Past editors include Marion Richardson, Dorothy Adkins, Norman Cliff, and Willem J. Heiser. According to Journal Citation Reports, the journal had a 2019 impact factor of 1.959.

History
In 1935 LL Thurstone, EL Thorndike and JP Guilford founded Psychometrika and also the Psychometric Society.

Editors-in-chief
The complete list of editor-in-chief of Psychometrika can be found at: 

https://www.psychometricsociety.org/content/past-psychometrika-editors

The following is a subset of persons who  have been editor-in-chief of Psychometrika:
 Paul Horst
 Albert K. Kurtz
 Dorothy Adkins
 Norman Cliff
 Roger Millsap
 Shizuhiko Nishisato
 Willem J. Heiser
 Irini Moustaki
 Matthias von Davier

Some notable papers

See also
 List of scientific journals in statistics

References

External links
Psychometrika
The Psychometric Society

Psychometrics journals
Publications established in 1936
Quarterly journals
Academic journals published by learned and professional societies of the United States
English-language journals
Mathematical and statistical psychology journals